The Amtrak Susquehanna River Bridge is a Howe deck truss structure that carries two tracks of Amtrak's Northeast Corridor line across the Susquehanna River between Havre de Grace and Perryville, Maryland.

History 
The vicinity of the bridge has been used as a river crossing for more than 300 years. In 1695, the colonial General Assembly granted the first licenses to operate a ferry between Perryville and what is now Havre de Grace. In 1837, railroad lines south from Wilmington, Delaware, and north from Baltimore arrived at the riverbanks. For 29 years, including the duration of the American Civil War, a train ferry carried passengers (on foot) and freight cars between the two towns. In 1854, a larger ferryboat began to transport entire passenger cars across the river.

In 1866, after 12 years of intermittent construction, the Philadelphia, Wilmington, and Baltimore Railroad (PW&B) completed a wooden single-track railroad bridge. Iron reinforcements were added between 1874 and 1880.

In 1904-06, the PRR replaced the PW&B crossing with a new bridge just a few yards upstream. Opened on May 29, 1906, it includes a center swing span to increase vertical clearance for water traffic from the nominal . In 1934, the PRR began installing catenary on the span to help extend 11,000-volt electrification south from Wilmington to Washington, D.C. Regular electrified passenger service across the bridge began on February 10, 1935.

Ownership of the bridge passed to Amtrak in 1976 when it acquired much of the Northeast Corridor infrastructure.

Present status 
Freight traffic, operated by Norfolk Southern Railway under a trackage rights agreement, is generally restricted to nighttime hours to avoid interfering with passenger operations.

The only significant commercial water traffic under the bridge consists of barges from a large granite quarry just upstream of Havre de Grace.  The bridge's swing span rarely needs to be opened; vessels that require such an opening must provide 24-hour advance notice.

In 2005 and 2007, Amtrak replaced the ties on the bridge, installed continuous welded rail, and installed new deck-level maintenance walkways, changes meant to extend the life of the bridge by 20 to 25 years.

In May 2011, the U.S. Department of Transportation announced $22 million in funding for engineering and environmental work to replace the bridge. (The Bush River and Gunpowder River bridges, two spans of similar age on the Northeast Corridor in Maryland, were also under consideration for replacement.) The project study began in 2013 and was completed in 2017. In 2017, Amtrak identified the bridge replacement as one of their 'Ready To Build' projects for the Northeast Corridor. 

In November 2022, Amtrak announced plans to replace the bridge, with design and construction contracts to be awarded in 2023 by Amtrak, the FRA, and MDOT MTA.

References

External links
 Susquehanna River Rail Bridge Project

Amtrak bridges
Bridges completed in 1906
Bridges over the Susquehanna River
Buildings and structures in Havre de Grace, Maryland
Pennsylvania Railroad bridges
Railroad bridges in Maryland
Steel bridges in the United States
Bridges in Cecil County, Maryland
Bridges in Harford County, Maryland
1906 establishments in Maryland